Indus Town is a neighbourhood of Bhopal, India. It lies on Hoshangabad Road, 14 km from Habibganj railway station, near Ratanpur village. 

Neighbourhoods in Bhopal